Itale is an administrative ward in Ileje District, Songwe Region, Tanzania. According to the 2012 census, the ward has a total population of 7,609, up from 6,720 in 2002.

References

Wards of Songwe Region